Guardbridge railway station served the village of Guardbridge, Fife, Scotland from 1862 to 1965 on The St. Andrews Railway.

History 
The station opened on 1 July 1852 by The St. Andrews Railway. To the south was the signal box, to the west was the goods yard and Seggie Brick and Tile Works and to the north was Guardbridge Paper Mill. This closed in 2008. The station closed to both passengers and goods traffic on 6 September 1965.

References

External links
RAILSCOT - Guard Bridge

Disused railway stations in Fife
Former North British Railway stations
Railway stations in Great Britain opened in 1862
Railway stations in Great Britain closed in 1965
1862 establishments in Scotland
1965 disestablishments in Scotland
Beeching closures in Scotland